Chuguyevka may refer to:
Chuguyevka (air base), a military air base in Primorsky Krai, Russia
Chuguyevka (rural locality), a rural locality (a selo) in Primorsky Krai, Russia